"Hang You from the Heavens" is the debut single by American alternative rock band The Dead Weather. It was released on March 11, 2009 and was backed with a cover of Gary Numan's "Are 'Friends' Electric?". The single was released through iTunes and on a 7" vinyl limited to 150 copies, all of which were given to the crowd at the band's debut performance at the opening of the Third Man Records headquarters. The 7" was later released through their website, and record stores.

The song was released as downloadable content for the Rock Band series on July 14, 2009 along with "No Hassle Night" and "Treat Me Like Your Mother".

In the fall of 2009, this song was featured in TV spots to promote the premiere of The Vampire Diaries, an American television series that airs on The CW.

Track listing

Music video
A low budget music video was made in promotion of the single. The video was shot entirely in black and white and features the band members sitting inside of a photo booth in various sequence and combination. The band are all wearing black leather jackets and bring in various objects and clothes into the booth. One object brought in multiple times is a piece of cardboard with a circular hole which each member brings in at a certain point and stares into.

There are two primary camera angles used during the video. The first angle comes from just outside the booth and oversees the members entrance into the booth. The other angle comes from inside the booth, filming the member in front of a curtain. The first angle is used exclusively until 2:27 when the second angle becomes used exclusively.

Personnel
 Alison Mosshart – vocals
 Dean Fertita – guitar
 Jack Lawrence – bass
 Jack White – drums, vocals, production

Chart performance

References

External links
 Music Video

2009 debut singles
The Dead Weather songs
Third Man Records singles
Songs written by Alison Mosshart
Songs written by Dean Fertita
2009 songs